Richland Creek is a  long 3rd order tributary to Reedy Fork in Guilford County, North Carolina.

History
Richland Creek was the scene of the Battle of Guilford Courthouse in 1781.

Course
Richland Creek rises on the Buffalo Creek divide at Jaycee Park in Greensboro in Guilford County.  Richland Creek then flows north through Guilford Courthouse National Military Park and then turns northeast to Richland Lake.  It drains into Lake Townsend, where it meets Reedy Fork.

Watershed
Richland Creek drains  of area, receives about 45.3 in/year of precipitation, has a topographic wetness index of 440.36 and is about 20% forested.

References

External links
Guilford Courthouse National Military Park on Wikipedia

Rivers of North Carolina
Rivers of Guilford County, North Carolina